The following lists events that happened during 2005 in Cape Verde.

Incumbents
President: Pedro Pires
Prime Minister: José Maria Neves

Events
ALUPEC was recognized by the Cape Verdean government as the writing system for Cape Verdean Creole
Serra Malagueta Natural Park on Santiago established
A campus of the Jean Piaget University of Cape Verde was opened in Mindelo
Several municipalities were created:
Tarrafal de São Nicolau and Ribeira Brava from the former municipality of São Nicolau
São Lourenço dos Órgãos, from part of Santa Cruz
São Salvador do Mundo, from part of Santa Catarina
Ribeira Grande, from part of Praia
Santa Catarina do Fogo, from part of São Filipe
February 25: Halcyonair airline established
October 6: The first flight to the new Praia International Airport (since 2012: Nelson Mandela International Airport), which replaced the old Francisco Mendes International Airport,

Sports

FC Derby won the Cape Verdean Football Championship

References

 
Years of the 21st century in Cape Verde
2000s in Cape Verde
Cape Verde
Cape Verde